Izmir Demirspor is a Turkish football club from Izmir. The team was founded in 1955 and plays in blue kits.

Currently the club plays in the Amatör Futbol Ligleri.

Stadium
Currently the team plays at the 15500 capacity İzmir Alsancak Stadium.

League participations
 TFF Second League: 1963–1964
 TFF Third League: ?

References

External links
Amatorfutbol

See also
1963–64 Turkish Second Football League

Football clubs in Turkey
Association football clubs established in 1955
Railway association football teams
1955 establishments in Turkey